Ganahl is a surname. Notable people with the surname include:

Heidi Ganahl (born 1966), American businesswoman and author
Manuel Ganahl (born 1990), Austrian ice hockey player
Markus Ganahl (born 1975), Liechtensteiner alpine skier 
Rainer Ganahl (born 1961), Austrian-American artist